Scars of Love is the debut studio album by American Latin freestyle group TKA, released on October 11, 1987 through Tommy Boy Records. The album spawned six singles, the first, "One Way Love," was the most successful single, which reached number 75 on the US Billboard Hot 100. No other single from this album managed to enter the Hot 100, although all of them the Top 30 of the Billboard Dance Club Songs. The album reached number 135 on the Billboard 200 in 1988.

Track listing

Formats
CD – 9 track version includes the new track "Broken Dreams"
Vinyl – 8 track version omits the track "Broken Dreams"

Charts

Weekly charts

References

1987 debut albums
TKA albums
Tommy Boy Records albums